Akdalaite (IMA symbol: Akd) is a very rare mineral found in Kazakhstan and has the formula 5Al2O3·H2O. It was formerly believed to be 4Al2O3·H2O. It is therefore the same as tohdite an artificially produced phase. Studies on the crystal structure and spectra indicate that this is an aluminium oxide hydroxide.

References

External links 

 Fact sheet from mindat.org
 Fact sheet from webmineral.com

Oxide minerals
Hydroxide minerals
Aluminium minerals
Hexagonal minerals